The Laundromat Cafe is the name borne by a chain of four cafés in Copenhagen, Denmark and Reykjavík, Iceland. The first one opened in Elmegade 15, Nørrebro Copenhagen in 2004 and the second one in Århusgade 38, Østerbro Copenhagen two years later. In 2010 two more cafés were opened, at Austurstræti 9, Reykjavík, Iceland and at Gammel Kongevej 96 Frederiksberg, Denmark. As the name suggests, laundromats are co-located in the cafés.

The Laundromat Cafe was founded by four Icelandic friends in Copenhagen in 2004, though today only Fridrik Weisshappel remains.

References

External links
 The Laundromat Cafe official site
 Alt om København - In English
 An article from the Style Files
 Luvaville.com - site for urban parents

Coffeehouses and cafés in Denmark
Restaurants in Copenhagen
Companies based in Copenhagen Municipality